or  are English conversation schools, usually privately operated, in Japan.

Although the Japanese public education system mandates that English be taught as part of the curriculum from the fifth grade, the focus is generally on English grammar. Some students attend eikaiwa schools to supplement their school studies, to study a second language, to improve their business skills, as a hobby, to help socialize, or to prepare for travel or marriage. Many parents send their children to these schools in the hope of improving their child's hopes of higher education, or to provide exposure to the ways and manners of people from other cultures. Contracted foreign teachers are often the principal selling point of an eikaiwa business.

Schools
The major chains of commercial language schools have branches in cities and towns throughout Japan, and there are large numbers of smaller independent outfits. Several chains offer instruction in other languages, including Spanish, French, Italian, German, Chinese, and Korean. These languages are taught primarily at larger city branches or through videoconferencing. In 2002, foreign language instruction in Japan was a 670 billion yen industry, of which the five largest chains (Nova, GEOS, ECC, Aeon, and Berlitz) accounted for 25%. Nova, the biggest, filed for bankruptcy in October 2007, although the brand continues to thrive under different management. Berlitz was once considered one of the "Big Four", but its market share has declined in recent years and it was overtaken by ECC. ECC and Aeon have become the most widely recognized such schools in Japan. The large chains run extensive advertising campaigns in print and on television; they sometimes feature Japanese or international celebrities in their promotions and have a very high profile and strong brand recognition often built on the personal and professional qualities of the foreign staff currently contracted to work for them.

A 2008 assessment of the language study market for fiscal year 2007 showed it had shrunk by over 61%, an effect of Nova's collapse, although demand for some services like software and lessons for children had increased. GEOS filed for bankruptcy in April 2010, and was acquired by Nova. 

Average salaries for eikaiwa teachers have generally fallen since the 1980s. Eikaiwa teachers' unions have attempted to combat the decline in pay and benefits, with mixed results.

Staff
Eikaiwa teachers are generally native English speakers from the United States, the United Kingdom, Canada, Australia, Ireland, or New Zealand. According to The Japan Times, the Justice Ministry estimates that some 90 percent of foreign residents in Japan stay for three years or less. For eikaiwa teachers, however, that figure rises to between 96 and 97 percent.

Scandals
The American Club, once the largest school in Tochigi Prefecture, north of Tokyo, was sued twice by its employees in the space of 13 months for withheld wages. During the second lawsuit its directors fled, while ignoring a court order to pay. News reports indicated the business was closed, but according to its business registration it is still a legal operating entity with 30 million yen in equity, and has never been in a state of bankruptcy.

The collapse of the troubled Nova chain left thousands of western foreigners with no source of income and, in the majority of cases, no accommodation after their contracts were abruptly cancelled.

In 2014, Eikaiwa chain Gaba, famous for its "man-to-man" (one-to-one) lessons, came under fire from local print media for its handling of sexual harassment complaints against students. In the absence of a grievance procedure, the Gaba branch of the General Union had to resort to collective bargaining to resolve at least one dispute.

References

Further reading
 Craig Currie-Robson, English to Go: Inside Japan's Teaching Sweatshops (2015)
 Bruce Feiler, Learning to Bow: An American Teacher in a Japanese School (1991), later published as Learning to Bow: Inside the Heart of Japan
 Benjamin Hesse, Memoirs of a Gaijin (2007)
 David L. McConnell, Importing Diversity: Inside Japan's JET Program (2000)

English conversation schools in Japan